The Courier is a 2019 action thriller film directed by Zackary Adler, from a screenplay by Andy Conway and Nicky Tate. It stars Olga Kurylenko, Gary Oldman, Amit Shah, Alicia Agneson, Greg Orvis, Craig Conway, William Moseley and Dermot Mulroney.

The film was released in the United States on November 22, 2019, by Lionsgate and in the United Kingdom on December 20, 2019, by Signature Entertainment.

Plot
Ezekiel Mannings, a wealthy businessman and notorious crime lord who is under house arrest in New York, seeks the elimination of Nick Murch, the only witness who can tie him to a murder. Murch is sequestered in a heavily guarded safe room in London in order to give evidence against Mannings over a video link to the United States. An unnamed female courier and former special ops soldier delivers a package to the safe room, unaware that the package contains a cyanide gas weapon intended to kill Nick. She rescues Nick from the attack and discovers that his protection detail has been compromised. The two are trapped in an underground parking garage full of heavily armed men who have been sent to finish the job. The assassins have an hour to find and kill Nick and the courier before police backup arrives, but she kills all of them in a brutal battle and transports a gravely wounded Nick to a hospital. He survives to testify against Mannings.

Cast
 Olga Kurylenko as The Courier
 Gary Oldman as Ezekiel Mannings
 Amit Shah as Nick Murch
 Alicia Agneson as Agent Simmonds
 Greg Orvis as The Sniper
 Craig Conway as Agent Parlow
 William Moseley as Agent Bryant 
 Dermot Mulroney as Special Agent Roberts
 Calli Taylor as Alys Mannings

Production
In October 2018, it was announced Olga Kurylenko would star in the film, with Zackary Adler directing from a screenplay by Zackary Adler, James Edward Barker, Andy Conway and Nicky Tate, with Marc Goldberg and James Edward Barker producing under their Signature Films and Rollercoaster Angel Productions banner, respectively.

In January 2019, Gary Oldman joined the cast of the film. In February 2019, Dermot Mulroney, William Moseley, Amit Shah, Alicia Agneson and Craig Conway joined the cast of the film.

Principal photography began in February 2019.

Release
The Courier was released in the United States on November 22, 2019, by Lionsgate and in the United Kingdom on December 20, 2019, by Signature Entertainment.

Reception
On Metacritic, the film has a weighted average score of 15 out of 100, based on five critics, indicating "overwhelming dislike".

A scathing Rex Reed in the Observer named Oldman's performance the worst of his career, and said, "In the moronic thriller The Courier, nothing works on any level, but most of all where it matters most—a script that makes sense."

References

External links
 

2019 films
2019 action thriller films
American action thriller films
British action thriller films
Lionsgate films
2010s English-language films
Films directed by Zackary Adler
2010s American films
2010s British films